The 2003 Milan–San Remo was the 94th edition of the monument classic Milan–San Remo and was won by Italian Paolo Bettini of Quick-Step–Davitamon.

Results

References
Results from MilanSanRemo.co.uk

Milan–San Remo
March 2003 sports events in Europe
Milan-San Remo
Milan-San Remo
2003 in road cycling